Farukh may refer to:

Farukh, a village in Askeran
Farukh Ruzimatov, an Uzbek-Russian ballet dancer
Farukh Choudhary, Indian professional footballer
Farukh Abitov, retired Kyrgyzstani footballer
Farukh Khan, Pakistani woman politician
Mirza Farukh, translator Bible translations into Tatar